Julie Apap (1948 – 15 March 2011) was a Maltese ceramicist based in Msida, Malta. Throughout her career, she exhibited in Malta, USA, Egypt and Croatia. She studied ceramics in England and Malta and later taught the subject at a secondary school and at her own studio, The Pot Studio in Msida, Malta. The studio was a hub for a number of female Malta-based ceramicists during the 2000s.

Exhibitions
Between 1990 and 2006, Julie Apap participated in a variety of solo and group exhibitions, including: Group Exhibition with Jeni Caruana and Hedwig Hauck at Mdina Cathedral Museum (Mdina, Malta), Seven Women-Seven Temples at National Museum of Archeology, Malta, Collective Exhibition at California Institute of Integral Studies (California, U.S.A), Hypogeum at National Museum of Archeology (Valletta, Malta) and Lilliput Ceramics — collective exhibition (Zagreb, Croatia). In 2000 she participated in 5th Cairo Biennale for International Ceramics (Egypt).

References 

People from Msida
Maltese women artists
1948 births
2011 deaths
21st-century Maltese artists
20th-century Maltese artists
Maltese ceramicists
Women ceramists